Lamorvan mandir is a famous Hindu temple in Karman village. The area is accessed from Karman Road. It is an attraction, being a sacred place with an ancient temple dedicated to Lord Hanuman, Shiva &  construction going on of Ram Darbaar.

The area is also known for the place of Gopal Das Tyagi Ji Maharaj. This temple also known as Tyagi Baba mandir. It is situated near the "Lamariya" in Karman & near the railway crossing in right hand side of Karman road. The Mehant of this temple is Baba Trilochan Das Maharaj. This temple is famous for the festival of 'Guru Purnima'.

Hindu temples in Uttar Pradesh